HMS Hermione (F58) was a Leander-class frigate of the Royal Navy (RN). She was, like the rest of her class, named after a figure of mythology. Hermione was built by Alexander Stephen and Sons, though she was completed by Yarrow Shipbuilders. She was launched on 26 April 1967 and commissioned on 11 July 1969.

Operational service
In 1970, Hermione deployed to the Far East and Pacific visiting a variety of places and performing a number of duties. Hermione became quite used to such warm climates during the 1970s. In 1977 Hermione, as leader of the 5th Frigate Squadron, took part in the Fleet Review of the Royal Navy, in celebration of HM the Queen's Silver Jubilee.

In January 1980, Hermione began her modernisation programme, which included the addition of the Sea Wolf missile and the Exocet anti-ship missile, which forced the removal of Hermione's twin 4.5 in guns. The modernisation was completed in 1983 at Chatham Naval Dockyard, and Hermione was the last ship to leave when the dockyard closed. Upon the completion of her modernisation, Hermione joined the 8th Frigate Squadron. Hermione saw service in the Middle East, also being involved in the so-called 'Tanker War' during the Iran–Iraq War. In 1991, Hermione returned to the Middle East on an Armilla Patrol deployment, but in the following year Hermione was decommissioned and in 1997 she was sold to India for scrap.

The ship also enjoyed fame on BBC TV, through starring as "HMS Hero" in the acclaimed drama series Warship. All members of the crew were given "HMS Hero" cap tallies for filming purposes. The main ship used for filming was, however, HMS Phoebe.

Notable commanders
Notable commanders of the ship include Robert Squires (1971), Peter Stanford (1974–75) and John McAnally (1989).

References

Publications

 Marriott, Leo, 1983.  Royal Navy Frigates 1945-1983, Ian Allan Ltd, Surrey.

External links
 HMS Hermione Association website 
 Warship Episode Guide
 British Film Institute site on Warship
 Royal Navy leaflet on Warship, from the HMS Phoebe Association website
 Comments on Warship by series Director Michael Briant
 Webpage (at Home > Scriptwriting > Warship) about Michael J Bird's scripts for Warship

 

Leander-class frigates
1967 ships